Magno Mocelin (born 26 February 1974), known as Magno, is a  Brazilian former professional footballer who played as a forward.

His 15-year professional career, which was spent in four countries, was mainly associated with Alavés in Spain, for which he appeared in 208 official games and played in one UEFA Cup final.

Club career
Born in Curitiba, Paraná, Magno started playing professionally with Clube de Regatas do Flamengo and Grêmio Foot-Ball Porto Alegrense. He moved overseas in 1996, spending three seasons with Dutch Eredivisie club FC Groningen and being relegated at the end of his last.

Aged 24, Magno joined La Liga side Deportivo Alavés for the 1998–99 campaign, remaining six years with the Basques and playing an important attacking role (mainly as a substitute as the team reached the 2001 final of the UEFA Cup which was lost to Liverpool in extra time, where he was sent off). He subsequently returned to the Netherlands, signing for De Graafschap.

After a season back in the Netherlands with De Graafschap – also relegated from the top level – Magno started a Cypriot adventure in 2005, first playing with AC Omonia. On 6 June 2008, he moved to fellow First Division side AEK Larnaca FC on a one-year contract.

References

External links

1974 births
Living people
Brazilian footballers
Association football forwards
Campeonato Brasileiro Série A players
CR Flamengo footballers
Grêmio Foot-Ball Porto Alegrense players
Eredivisie players
FC Groningen players
De Graafschap players
La Liga players
Segunda División players
Deportivo Alavés players
Cypriot First Division players
AC Omonia players
AEK Larnaca FC players
Brazilian expatriate footballers
Expatriate footballers in the Netherlands
Expatriate footballers in Spain
Expatriate footballers in Cyprus
Brazilian expatriate sportspeople in the Netherlands
Brazilian expatriate sportspeople in Spain
Brazilian expatriate sportspeople in Cyprus
Footballers from Curitiba